Maghreb Association Sportive de Fès, commonly known as Maghreb de Fes or MAS Fes, is a Moroccan professional basketball team located in Fes. The team competes in the Division Excellence. Home games are played in the Salle 11 Janvier (11 January Hall), which was constructed in 2004 and holds 3,000 places.

The club has won five Moroccan championships, seven Moroccan cups and one African continental championship, in 1998.

Honours
FIBA Africa Clubs Champions CupChampions (1): 1998Division ExcellenceChampions (5): 1996, 1997, 1998, 2003, 2007
Runners-up (5): 2000, 2002, 2005, 2010, 2017Moroccan Throne CupChampions (7):''' 1989, 1992, 1995, 1996, 1997, 1998, 2008
Runners-up (10): 1991, 1993, 1999, 2001, 2002, 2003, 2009, 2010, 2013, 2018

Players

2020–21 roster
  El Houari Bassim
  Masrouri Omar
  Moujahid El Mehdi 
  Sekkat Hassan
  Oumalek Hicham
  Bouabid Ismail
  Atik Youness
  Filali Ayoub
  Azouaw Otmane
  Azzouzi Zakariae
  Achouri Ayoub
  Serrhini Zakariae

Notable players
 
 Jimmy Williams 
 Kayode Ayeni

References

External links
Presentation at Afrobasket.com

Sport in Fez, Morocco
Basketball teams in Morocco
Basketball teams established in 1946